Apogeshna stenialis, the checkered apogeshna moth, is a moth in the family Crambidae. It is found from Maine to Florida, west to Alabama, Illinois and Ohio. It is also found in Mexico (Veracruz, Tabasco), Panama, Honduras, and the Dominican Republic.

The wingspan is about 17 mm. The forewings are variably bright to pale yellow along the costa and brown along the inner margin and beyond the postmedial line. There is a hollow oval spot in median area, and another descending from the antemedial line. The hindwings are brown with large dark-edged pale patches. The fringes are dark with scattered pale patches. Adults are on wing in spring and summer.

References

Moths described in 1854
Spilomelinae
Moths of North America